Captain David McCampbell (January 16, 1910 – June 30, 1996) was a United States Navy captain, naval aviator, and a Medal of Honor recipient. He retired from the navy in 1964 with 31 years of service.

McCampbell is the United States Navy's all-time leading flying ace (called Ace of the Aces in the Navy) and top F6F Hellcat ace with 34 aerial victories. He was the third-highest American scoring ace of World War II and the highest-scoring American ace to survive the war. He also set a United States single mission aerial combat record of shooting down nine enemy planes in one mission, on October 24, 1944, at the beginning of the Battle of Leyte Gulf, in the Philippines.

Early life

McCampbell was born in Bessemer, Alabama, and raised in West Palm Beach, Florida. He attended the Staunton Military Academy, in Virginia, and one year at the Georgia School of Technology, in Atlanta, before his appointment to the United States Naval Academy in 1929, where he graduated with the class of 1933 with a degree in marine engineering.

United States Navy
McCampbell's naval career actually began with a dismissal. Graduating from the U.S. Naval Academy in depression-era 1933, he was rewarded with an honorable discharge from a Navy without funds. But on June 1, 1934, McCampbell was called back and commissioned as an ensign in the U.S. Naval Reserve. He went on active duty on June 14, 1934, and served aboard the heavy cruiser USS Portland from June 1934 to June 1937 before he started flight training at Naval Air Station Pensacola, Florida. He received his "wings of gold" as a Naval Aviator on April 21, 1938 and was assigned to Fighting Squadron Four (VF-4) on the aircraft carrier  to May 1940.

World War II
McCampbell served as a landing signal officer (LSO) from May 1940, surviving the sinking of the carrier  by a Japanese submarine near Guadalcanal on September 15, 1942. He returned to the United States, was promoted to Lieutenant Commander, and was stationed at Naval Air Station Melbourne, Florida as LSO Instructor until August 1943.

McCampbell formed Fighter Squadron 15 (VF-15) on September 1, 1943 and led the squadron before being reassigned as Commander of Air Group 15 (CAG-15) in February 1944 to September 1944. As Commander, Carrier Air Group (CAG) 15, he was Commander of the Essex Air Group (fighters, bombers, and torpedo bombers) when the group was embarked on the aircraft carrier . From April to November 1944, his group saw six months of combat and participated in two major air-sea battles, the First and Second Battles of the Philippine Sea. During the more than 20,000 hours of air combat operations before it returned to the United States for a rest period, Air Group 15 destroyed more enemy planes (315 airborne and 348 on the ground) and sank more enemy shipping than any other Air Group in the Pacific War. Air Group 15's attacks on the Japanese in the Marianas and at Iwo Jima, Taiwan, and Okinawa were key to the success of the "island hopping" campaign.

In addition to his duties as commander of the "Fabled Fifteen", then Commander McCampbell became the Navy's "ace of aces" during the missions he flew in 1944. McCampbell entered combat on May 14 and flew at least four Grumman F6F Hellcats while aboard the Essex: an F6F-3 named Monsoon Maiden (damaged by AA, removed from service on 20 May 1944), an F6F-3 named The Minsi ( kills), an F6F-5 named Minsi II, and an F6F-5 named Minsi III (Bureau Number 70143), in which he scored the last  of his 34 kills.

On June 19, 1944, during the "Marianas Turkey Shoot," Commander McCampbell shot down five Japanese Yokosuka D4Y 'Judy' dive-bombers, to become an "ace in a day". Later that afternoon, during a second sortie, McCampbell downed two Mitsubishi A6M 'Zekes' over Guam. 

On October 24, 1944, in the initial phase of the Battle of Leyte Gulf, in the Philippines, he became the only American airman to achieve "ace in a day" status twice. McCampbell and his wingman attacked a Japanese force of 60 aircraft. McCampbell shot down nine—seven Zeros and two Oscars—setting a U.S. single-mission aerial combat record. During this same action, his wingman downed another six Japanese warplanes. When he landed his Grumman F6F Hellcat aboard USS Langley (the flight deck of Essex wasn't clear), his six machine guns had just two rounds remaining, and his airplane had to be manually released from the arrestor wire due to complete fuel exhaustion. Commander McCampbell received the Medal of Honor for both actions, becoming the only Fast Carrier Task Force aviator to be so honored.

Aerial victories

Post-war
Following World War II, McCampbell had several postings. He returned to the United States in March 1945 and served as Chief of Staff to the Commander Fleet Air at NAS Norfolk, Virginia, until January 1947. He then attended Armed Forces Staff College in Norfolk, and remained as an instructor after graduating.

He served as the Senior Naval Aviation Advisor to the Argentine Navy, stationed at Buenos Aires, Argentina, from 1948 to January 1951, and then served as executive officer aboard  during the Korean War (although the ship did not participate in combat) from February 1951 to March 1952. He was promoted to captain in July 1952; he was assigned as the Planning Officer on the Staff of Commander Aircraft Atlantic from March 1952 to July 1953. He served as the Commanding Officer, Naval Air Technical Training Center Jacksonville at NAS Jacksonville, Florida, from July 1953 to July 1954. He then commanded the fleet oiler , followed by the aircraft carrier .

McCampbell was then assigned to the Joint Chiefs of Staff at the Pentagon from 1960 to September 1962. His final assignment was as Assistant Deputy Chief of Staff for Operations to the Commander in Chief, Continental Air Defense Command, where he served from September 1962 until his retirement from the navy on July 1, 1964.

Retirement and death
McCampbell retired from active duty in 1964. He died in Florida in 1996 and was interred at Arlington National Cemetery.

Military awards

McCampbell's decorations and awards include:

Medal of Honor citation
Rank and Organization: Commander, United States Navy, Air Group 15
Place and Date: First and second battles of the Philippine Sea, 19 June 1944
Entered Service at: Florida
Born: January 16, 1910, Bessemer, Alabama

Other honors

 In October 1988 the new passenger terminal at the Palm Beach International Airport was named in his honor.
 In 1996, McCampbell was inducted into the National Aviation Hall of Fame in Dayton, Ohio. 
 In 1999 he was inducted into the Georgia Aviation Hall of Fame.

See also
List of Medal of Honor recipients for World War II

References

External links

Dave McCampbell, Top U.S. Navy Ace, at acesofww2.com

Remembering David McCampbell – Ace of Aces
Arlington National Cemetery

1910 births
1996 deaths
Staunton Military Academy alumni
American World War II flying aces
United States Navy pilots of World War II
Burials at Arlington National Cemetery
United States Naval Aviators
Recipients of the Navy Cross (United States)
United States Navy Medal of Honor recipients
Recipients of the Silver Star
Georgia Tech alumni
United States Naval Academy alumni
United States Navy officers
Recipients of the Legion of Merit
Recipients of the Distinguished Flying Cross (United States)
Recipients of the Air Medal
People from Bessemer, Alabama
World War II recipients of the Medal of Honor
Military personnel from Alabama
People from West Palm Beach, Florida
Military personnel from Florida